Paris FC is a French women's football club based in Viry-Châtillon, a suburb of Paris. The club is the female section of Ligue 2 men's club Paris FC. The club was founded in 1971 and currently play in the Division 1 Féminine, the first division of women's football in France. The club has played in the first division since 1987.

Paris FC was founded in 1971 as Étoile Sportive de Juvisy-sur-Orge, the women's football section of local club ES Juvisy, based in Juvisy-sur-Orge. After 14 years, the section split from the club, formed its own club under the name Football Club Féminin Juvisy Essonne and moved to the commune of Viry-Châtillon. Despite moving from Juvisy-sur-Orge, the women's club retained the name FCF Juvisy amid financial backing and support from the commune and the General Council of Essonne. In the 1991–92 season, Juvisy won its first ever Division 1 Féminine championship. Between the years 1994–2003, the club won four league titles and later won a Challenge de France title in 2005 making Juvisy one of the most successful clubs in women's French football. Juvisy was a regular participant in the UEFA Women's Cup and, in the 2010–11 season, made its first appearance in the re-branded UEFA Women's Champions League. On 6 July 2017, FCF Juvisy was sold to Paris FC as its female section and moved from an amateur structure to a full-time professional setup.

The club is managed by Emmanuel Beauchet and captained by French international Gaëtane Thiney. Retired footballer Sandrine Soubeyrand is the all-time leader in caps by a French international and has made more than 200 appearances for Juvisy. One of the club's other notable players include Marinette Pichon. Pichon is the women's national team all-time leading goalscorer.

Record in UEFA competitions
All results (away, home and aggregate) list Juvisy's goal tally first.

a First leg.

Rivalries 
The Parisians share a strong rivalry with Paris Saint-Germain. Known as the Parisian Derby, the both teams compete for recognition as the capital's top team. Prior to the rise of PSG into an elite club in the 2010s, Paris FC were the biggest team in the land and usually had the upper hand against their city rivals. In fact, PFC were the last side to win the league title, aside from Lyon in 2006, before PSG claimed their first crown in 2021. Nowadays, PSG dominate the derby thanks to the huge gulf created between them by the investment of their Qatari owners, while Paris FC are trying to establish themselves as France's third team.

Gallery

Players

Current squad
As of 2 August 2022.

Out on Loan

Former notable players
 Oriane Jean-François
 Camille Catala
 Élise Bussaglia
 Kadidiatou Diani
 Stéphanie Mugneret-Béghé
 Marinette Pichon
 Sandrine Soubeyrand
 Nelly Guilbert
 Sarah Bouhaddi

Honours

Domestic
Division 1 Féminine
Winners (6): 1991–92, 1993–94, 1995–96, 1996–97, 2002–03, 2005–06

Coupe de France
Winners (1): 2005

European
UEFA Women's Champions League 
Semi-finalists: 2012–13

Invitation
Menton Tournament
Winners (1): 1993

National competition record

Gallery

References

External links
 Official website 

Women's football clubs in France
Association football clubs established in 1971
1971 establishments in France
Division 1 Féminine clubs
Football clubs in Île-de-France
Sport in Essonne
Women in Paris